Boys and Girls or Boys & Girls may refer to:

Film
 Boys and Girls (1983 film), a 1983 short film directed by Don McBrearty
 Boys and Girls (2000 film), a 2000 romantic-comedy film of two people whose lives are intertwined through fate

Music
 Boys & Girls (67 Special EP), a 2005 EP by 67 Special
 Boys & Girls (album), a 2012 studio album by Alabama Shakes
 Boys + Girls (The Promise Ring EP), a 1998 EP by The Promise Ring
 Boys and Girls (album), a 1985 studio album by Bryan Ferry
 "Boys & Girls" (Asian Kung-Fu Generation song), a 2018 song by Asian Kung-Fu Generation
 "Boys & Girls" (Ayumi Hamasaki song), a 1999 song by Ayumi Hamasaki
 "Boys & Girls" (Martin Solveig song), a 2009 song by Martin Solveig featuring Dragonette
 "Boys and Girls" (Angelica Agurbash song), a 2005 song by Angelica Agurbash
 "Boys and Girls" (Human League song), a 1981 song by The Human League
 "Boys and Girls" (Mandy Smith song), a 1988 Pop-dance song in the album Mandy
 "Boys and Girls" (Pixie Lott song), a 2009 song by Pixie Lott
 Boys & Girls (will.i.am song), a 2016 song by will.i.am  featuring Pia Mia
 "Boys and Girls", a song from Girls' Generation's 2010 album Oh!

Television
 "Boys and Girls" (The Office episode), a 2006 episode of The Office
 "Guide to: Boys and Girls", a 2007 episode of Ned's Declassified School Survival Guide
 Boys and Girls (TV series), a 2003 British gameshow by Channel 4

Other
 Boys & Girls Clubs of America, a youth organization established in 1906
 "Boys and Girls" (short story), a short story by Alice Munro

See also
 Girls & Boys (disambiguation)